Yevgeny Spiridonov (born 16 March 1947) is a Russian former swimmer. He competed in the men's 100 metre backstroke at the 1968 Summer Olympics for the Soviet Union.

References

External links
 

1947 births
Living people
Russian male swimmers
Olympic swimmers of the Soviet Union
Swimmers at the 1968 Summer Olympics
Swimmers from Saint Petersburg
Soviet male swimmers